Shawn Williams (born June 20, 1974 in Scarborough, Ontario) is the inaugural General Manager and Head Coach of the Las Vegas Desert Dogs in the National Lacrosse League (NLL). He is a former Canadian lacrosse player who played for the Ontario Raiders, Toronto Rock, Buffalo Bandits, Rochester Knighthawks and Edmonton Rush of the NLL and the Hamilton Nationals of Major League Lacrosse. He was also previously a scout for the Buffalo Bandits and assistant coach with the Colorado Mammoth. He was inducted to the NLL Hall of Fame in 2021 as a first ballot nominee.

NLL career 
Williams started his NLL career in 1998 with the Ontario Raiders. The Raiders moved to Toronto the next year, becoming the Toronto Rock. Following the 1999 season, Williams was traded to the Buffalo Bandits for a draft pick, and played two seasons in Buffalo. On May 18, 2001, Williams was traded again, this time to the Rochester Knighthawks as part of a seven player blockbuster deal.

Williams played his best season in 2004. When Knighthawk star John Grant, Jr. went down with a season-ending knee injury, Williams picked up the slack, finishing 8th in the league in points with 81, 3rd in goals with 45, and was named to the first All-Pro team. He was named Overall Player of the Week three times — all in the last four weeks of the season — and Offensive Player of the Week five times.

Williams has played in six NLL All-Star games, in 2002, 2005, 2006, 2007, 2008, and 2009 scoring the overtime winning goal in the 2008 game.

After ten seasons in Rochester, Williams was traded in October 2011 along with Aaron Bold to the Edmonton Rush for Ryan Cousins, Alex Kedoh Hill, and Andy Secore.

Williams was traded from Edmonton to Minnesota for two second round picks in the 2013 NLL Entry Draft. Minnesota then sent him to Buffalo with Brendon Doran, a 2012 first round pick, and two 2012 second round picks for the third overall pick in 2012.

MSL / WLA Career
Williams has been a member of the Brooklin Redmen of the MSL since 1996, other than 2003, when he played one year in the WLA for the Coquitlam Adanacs. He was a member of the Mann Cup-winning Redmen in 2000. He has won the Bucko McDonald Memorial Trophy as the top scorer in the MSL three times, in 1999, 2001 (co-winner with Josh Sanderson), and again in 2004. Williams also holds the MSL record for most points in a game — 21, set on July 26, 1999 against the Ohsweken Wolves.

Field lacrosse

Williams is also an accomplished field lacrosse player, and has been a member of Team Canada at the last two World Lacrosse Championships. He also served as the coach for Brock University. On June 9, 2009, Williams was inducted into the Brock Badgers Hall of Fame.

Statistics

NLL
Reference:

Canadian Lacrosse Association

Awards

References

1974 births
Living people
Brock University alumni
Buffalo Bandits players
Canadian lacrosse players
Edmonton Rush players
Lacrosse people from Ontario
National Lacrosse League All-Stars
National Lacrosse League major award winners
Rochester Knighthawks players
Sportspeople from Scarborough, Toronto
Hamilton Nationals players
Toronto Rock players